"Happiness" is the twentieth single by Japanese boy band, Arashi, as well as its title song's name. The single was released on September 5, 2007, in two editions: a regular edition containing the karaoke versions of the songs released in the single, and a limited edition containing a bonus track. The single is the group's ninth consecutive and seventeenth overall number one release, as well as their third consecutive English-titled release.

Single information
"Happiness" was used as the theme song for the drama Yamada Tarō Monogatari starring Arashi members Kazunari Ninomiya and Sho Sakurai.

The song's music video was included in their official YouTube channel, when it opened in 2019, and later on, also a live version. The song was also included in their official pages of streaming sites Apple Music, Spotify, and the such.

Track listing

Charts and certifications

Charts

Certifications

Release history

References

External links
  Happiness product information 
 Happiness Oricon profile 

Arashi songs
2007 singles
Oricon Weekly number-one singles
Japanese television drama theme songs
2007 songs
J Storm singles